Anantapur refers to a city in India. It may also refer to:

India 
Anantapur district, a district in Andhra Pradesh
Ananthapuram, a panchayat town in Viluppuram district of Tamil Nadu state
Anantapur, Purba Medinipur, a census town and a gram panchayat in Purba Medinipur district, West Bengal

Sri Lanka 
Ananthapuram, Sri Lanka, a village in Sri Lanka